Yukiharu is a masculine Japanese given name.

Possible writings
Yukiharu can be written using different combinations of kanji characters. Here are some examples: 

幸治, "happiness, to manage"
幸春, "happiness, spring"
幸晴, "happiness, to clear up"
幸温, "happiness, to warm up"
行治, "to go, to manage"
行春, "to go, spring"
行晴, "to go, to clear up"
行温, "to go, to warm up"
之治, "of, to manage"
之春, "of, spring"
之晴, "of, to clear up"
之温, "of, to warm up"
志治, "determination, to manage"
志春, "determination, spring"
雪治, "snow, to manage"
恭治, "respectful, to manage"
由起治 "reason, to rise, to manage"
由紀治 "reason, chronicle, to manage"
有紀治 "to have, chronicle, to manage"

The name can also be written in hiragana ゆきはる or katakana ユキハル.

Notable people with the name

, Japanese politician
, Japanese water polo player
, Japanese judoka

Japanese masculine given names